
Al-Ashraf, either from  ('the most noble') or  ('the nobles'), may refer to:

People
 Al-Ashraf Al-Barsbay, Burji Mamluk sultan of Egypt (1422–1438)
 Al-Ashraf Qansuh al-Ghuri, Mamluk Sultan (1501–1516)
 Al-Ashraf Janbalat, Sultan of Egypt (1500–1501)
 Al-Ashraf Khalil, Mamluk Sultan (1290–1293)
 Al-Ashraf Kujuk, Mamluk Sultan (1341–1342)
 Al-Ashraf Musa, Emir of Homs (1246–1263) 
 Al-Ashraf Musa, Sultan of Egypt (1250–1254)
 Al-Ashraf Musa, Emir of Damascus and Ba'albek (1229–1237)
 Al-Ashraf Sha'ban, Mamluk Sultan (1363–1377)
 Al-Ashraf Tuman bay,  last Sultan of Egypt (1516–1517)
 Al-Ashraf Umar II (1242–1296), Rasulid sultan, mathematician and astronomer

Places
 Al Ashraf, Makkah, village in Makkah Region of Saudi Arabia
 Al Ashraf, 'Asir, village in 'Asir Region of Saudi Arabia
 Al-Ashraf (Taiz), district in Yemen

Mosques
 Al-Ashraf Mosque in Cairo, built by Al-Ashraf Al-Barsbay

Title
 Ashrāf or al-Ashrāf, title for those claiming descent from the family of the prophet Muhammad

See also
 Ashraf (disambiguation)